The Capital One Tower is a Class A skyscraper located in Lake Charles, Louisiana and is the tallest building in the city.

The building was designed by Lloyd Jones Brewer Associates of Houston and was constructed by Miner-Dederick of Houston and F. Miller and Sons of Lake Charles. Construction began in March 1981 with groundbreaking in January 1982. The tower is part of a four-acre lot that includes an attaching parking garage. The cost was estimated at $45 million.

Capital One Tower is one of the dominant features of the skyline of downtown Lake Charles. The building was originally called the CM Tower, for Calcasieu Marine National Bank, then renamed the Hibernia tower after Hibernia purchased Calcasieu Marine. It was then changed to Capital One Tower after Capital One Bank acquired Hibernia National Bank in 2005.

Floor Navigation

Two escalators in the atrium (one up and one down) serve as access between floor 1 (ground floor) and floor 2 near the bank area.

Eight passenger elevators provide access to the upper floors and are grouped in two banks of four with each bank having two cars facing each other linked by a hall. The West bank serves floors 2, 15-21 and the East most two cars also serve floor 1. Access to the elevators from floor 1 is just West inside the North entrance behind the security desk. The East bank of elevators serve floors 2–14.

A freight elevator provides access to all floors.

Two stairways provide access to all floors and are located behind each elevator bank.

A walkway bridge connects floor 2 of the tower to floor 3 of the parking garage. Two passenger elevators and two stairways in the parking garage serve floors 1-5 of the garage.

Hurricane damage

The building sustained heavy damage to its atrium and several upper floors during Hurricane Rita, which made landfall as a Category 3 hurricane in 2005. In 2007, the facility underwent major repairs and security upgrades such as the addition of ballistic protection of the exterior glass walls. The reconstruction of the lower floors and the renovations of the atrium, tower facade, and major tenant spaces were designed and project-managed by Vincent-Shows Architects of Sulphur.

The tower was significantly damaged again in 2020 by Category 4 Hurricane Laura. The building lost the majority of its windows, and the side of the building facing south was destroyed.

References

Skyscrapers in Louisiana
Buildings and structures in Lake Charles, Louisiana
Bank buildings in Louisiana
Capital One
Skyscraper office buildings in Louisiana
Office buildings completed in 1982